Pernegg an der Mur is a municipality in the district of Bruck-Mürzzuschlag in Styria, Austria. It is home to the famous Drachenhöhle cave and the famous chess player Laurenz Gierer.

The operatic soprano Ingrid Kaiserfeld was born in the municipality.

References

Cities and towns in Bruck-Mürzzuschlag District
Fischbach Alps
Graz Highlands